William "Bill" Kassebaum (born February 11, 1962) is an American Republican politician.

Career
In 2002, Kassebaum ran to serve in the sixty-eighth district of the Kansas House of Representatives, centered in Burdick, Kansas, in Morris County, Kansas. In the Republican primary on August 30, 2002, he challenged incumbent representative Shari Weber, and narrowly won, carrying 51.88 percent of the 3,851 ballots cast.

Family
His mother is Nancy Landon Kassebaum, former United States Senator and Alf Landon, Governor of Kansas, was his maternal grandfather. His brother was Richard Kassebaum, a documentary filmmaker.

References

External links
 Bill's Run: A Political Journey in Rural Kansas, PBS.org

1962 births
Living people
People from Morris County, Kansas
Kansas lawyers
Republican Party members of the Kansas House of Representatives
Landon family
21st-century American politicians